Preethi Asrani (born ) is an Indian actress who primarily appears in Telugu films. She played the lead role in the Tamil soap opera Minnale on Sun TV. She debuted as a lead actress with Pressure Cooker (2020).

Early life 
Asrani is a Sindhi from Gujarat. She moved to Hyderabad to pursue a career in cinema. As of 2020, she is enrolled at St. Ann's College for Women in Hyderabad. Her cousin, Anju Asrani, is an actress.

Career 
At age sixteen, Asrani debuted in the short film Fidaa, where she portrayed a blind girl. She made her television debut with Pakkinti Ammayi. She starred in the film Malli Raava (2017) and played the younger version of the main actress in the film. Her performance in the film enabled her to receive offers to act in other films. 

After Malli Rava, Asrani signed a film starring Naga Shaurya and Eesha Rebba, but the film failed to take off. In 2018, she debuted in Tamil television with Sun TV's Minnale and plays the lead role in the serial. Asrani debuted as a lead actress with Pressure Cooker (2020) opposite Sai Ronak.

Filmography

Films 
All films are in Telugu, unless otherwise noted.

Television

References

External links 

Living people
Indian film actresses
Actresses in Telugu cinema
Actresses in Telugu television
Actresses in Tamil television
Year of birth missing (living people)
21st-century Indian actresses
Sindhi people
2000s births